The Ministry of External Affairs (abbreviated as MEA) of India is the government agency responsible for implementing Indian foreign policy. The Ministry of External Affairs is headed by the Minister of External Affairs, a Cabinet Minister. The Foreign Secretary, an Indian Foreign Service officer, is the most senior civil servant who is the head of the Department of Foreign Affairs. The Ministry represents the Government of India through embassies and is also responsible for India's representation at the United Nations and other international organizations and expanding and safeguarding India’s influence and Indian interests across the world by providing developmental aid to other countries worth billions of dollars. It also advises other Ministries and State Governments on foreign governments and institutions.

Committee on External Affairs is tasked with this ministry's legislative oversight.

History
The Ministry was initially the Ministry of External Affairs and Commonwealth Relations, a holdover from the British Raj. It was renamed the Ministry of External Affairs in 1948. Prime Minister Jawaharlal Nehru held the portfolio as an additional charge till his death in 1964 and it was only then that a separate Minister with Cabinet rank was appointed. The ministry is responsible for the administration of Naga Hills, Tuensang Area, Indian Emigration Act of 1923, the Reciprocity Act of 1943, the Port Haj Committee Act of 1932, the Indian Merchant Shipping Act in so far as it relates to pilgrim ships, the Indian Pilgrim Shipping Rules of 1933, the Protection of Pilgrims Act of 1887 (Bombay) and the Protection of the Mohammedan Pilgrims Act of 1896 (Bengal).

The Ministry was integrated Ministry of Overseas Indian Affairs on 7 January 2016. The government said that the decision was taken in line with government's "overall objective of minimizing government and maximizing governance" and that it will help the government address duplication as well as unnecessary delays.

The Ministry is the cadre-controlling authority of the Indian Foreign Service; the service is wholly under the administration and supervision of the External Affairs Ministry.

Organizational structure
The Ministry of External Affairs is headed by the Minister of External Affairs (or simply, the Foreign Minister; in Hindi Videsh Mantri).The Foreign Secretary is the most senior civil servant who is the head of the Department of Foreign Affairs, and is supported by other secretary level officers.
Foreign Secretary — Vinay Kwatra
Secretary (West) — Sanjay Verma
Secretary (East) — Saurabh Kumar
Secretary (Economic Relations)  — Dammu Ravi
Secretary (Consular, Passport, Visa and Overseas Indian Affairs) — Ausaf Sayeed
Additional Secretary (Oceania division) — ; post created in 2020
Official Spokesperson and Joint Secretary (External Publicity) — Arindam Bagchi

Development Partnership Administration
Development Partnership Administration (DPA) is an agency under the Ministry of External Affairs formed in 2013 to increase its strategic footprint and for the effective execution of projects with professionals from diverse backgrounds. India has an elaborate project portfolio in its neighbourhood, including Bhutan, Nepal, Afghanistan, Maldives, Sri Lanka, and Bangladesh, as well as Africa and Latin America. It is headed by Sujata Mehta, one of India’s foremost diplomats and former Indian representative to the UN Conference on Disarmament, Geneva. Mehta is Special Secretary in the MEA. According to OECD estimates, 2019 official development assistance from India increased to US$1.6 billion.

India Perspectives
India Perspectives is the flagship publication of the Ministry of External Affairs. A bi-monthly magazine, it is digitally published in English and Hindi, and 14 other international languages, with a readership spanning 170 countries. It is crafted to support the Ministry’s diplomatic initiatives and highlight India’s bilateral ties with the rest of the world.

The magazine provides an insight into India’s culture and tradition along with elements of contemporary India. With intelligent, analytical and verified editorial content, the publication is one of the most authentic sources of information regarding India’s ‘soft diplomacy’ initiatives as well as its rich cultural, scientific and political heritage. By showcasing the country’s various facets through original stories on travel, art, music, cinema and more, the magazine takes India to the world.

Location
The office of the Ministry is located in the South Block building which also contains the Prime Minister's office and Ministry of Defence. Other offices are located in Jawaharlal Nehru Bhawan, Shastri Bhawan, Patiala House, and ISIL Building.

Parliamentary Standing Committee  
Parliamentary Standing Committee on External Affairs is mandated with the task of the legislative oversight of the Ministry of External Affairs.

See also
 Raisina Dialogue
 Indian Council of World Affairs
 Chanakyapuri
 List of diplomatic missions in India
 List of diplomatic missions of India

References

External links
 Official website of the Ministry of External Affairs
Official Twitter handle of the Ministry

 
E
India
Ministries established in 1948
1948 establishments in India